Jiddu Krishnamurti or J. Krishnamurti (12 May 189517 February 1986) was a writer and speaker on philosophical and spiritual issues. His subject matter included psychological revolution, the nature of the mind, meditation, human relationships, and bringing about positive social change. Works about his life and his philosophy first appeared in the early-20th-century;  related works have continued appearing in several subject areas, and in a variety of formats and media.Some of his works are used in Universities around the world.

About the works

Subject biography

Jiddu Krishnamurti was born 1895 in the town of Madanapalle in then-colonial India, to a family of middle class Telugu Brahmins. His father was associated with the Theosophical Society, and in the early part of the 20th century young Krishnamurti came to be promoted by the leadership of the Society as the so-called World Teacher, a new messiah. In 1929 he disavowed this role and dissolved the worldwide organization (the Order of the Star) formed to support it. He severed his ties to Theosophy and the Theosophical Society, and declared independence from all religious, philosophical, and cultural disciplines and practices.

He spent the rest of his life presenting a uniquely expressed philosophy of life around the world, asserting that only unflinching self-inquiry can lead to genuine discovery and to resolution of all personal and social conflict. Until his death in 1986 he was constantly stressing the need for a revolution in the psyche of every human being, while positing that such revolution cannot be brought about by any external entity, be it religious, political, or social.

Timeline and availability
Works and news items about Krishnamurti started appearing in the beginning of the 20th century, shortly after his "discovery" as a possible new Messiah. The extraordinary circumstances surrounding young Krishnamurti, and the related proclamations of Theosophical leaders, resulted in intense scrutiny and publicity throughout his "messianic" period. Interest was renewed and amplified by his later repudiation of the so-called World Teacher Project and of Theosophy. During his middle years publicity and interest lessened, but did not disappear; by the late 1960s he was firmly reestablished in the public stage, with a corresponding increase in the number of works and news items about him.

Since his death in 1986 books, monographs, research papers in various disciplines, news items etc., in print and other media, have continued to appear, examining various aspects of Krishnamurti and his message.

Krishnamurti has additionally been the subject of, or a claimed source of inspiration in, the works of artists in diverse fields (see section Artistic depictions below). They have included playwrights and actors, musicians, novelists, and at least one choreographer.

, according to one source, Krishnamurti-related materials numbered "2,412 works in 4,580 publications in 53 languages and 46,822 library holdings".

Listing of works

List guidelines and format
 With the exception of the section Mass media items, entries for each class type and publishing medium have been listed alphabetically by primary author or creator, and then (in ascending order) by the original publication or release date. In the absence of this date, the earliest dated edition is used. If no other date is available, the date of work is listed when feasible.
  Additional editions or imprints (incl. other media formats) of cited works are listed consecutively in ascending date order, separated by double semicolons (). Information common to all listed editions appears in the first listing only.
 List is not meant to be exhaustive and should not be considered a complete representation of works about Jiddu Krishnamurti.

Format: Last, First (date [per point 1 above]). Title [in italics or "quotation marks"].<reference>[comments].<further references as needed [appearing under Notes and sources]>

Principal biographies 
 Print
The following people were authorized by Krishnamurti to write his biography.

  Lutyens, Mary (1975). Krishnamurti: The Years of Awakening. Also an official biographer, Mary Lutyens was a lifelong confidante of Krishnamurti whom she first met 1911, while she was still a toddler. This first volume of a three-volume biography of Krishnamurti covers years from birth in 1895 to year-end 1933.
 Lutyens, Mary (1983). Krishnamurti: The Years of Fulfilment. Second volume of her biography covers years 1933 to 1980.
 Jayakar, Pupul (1986). Krishnamurti: A Biography. Pupul Jayakar met Krishnamurti in 1948 and remained a friend and associate until his death.
 Lutyens, Mary (1988). Krishnamurti: The Open Door. Final volume of biography covers years 1980 to 1986, the end of Krishnamurti's life.
 Lutyens, Mary (1996). Krishnamurti and the Rajagopals. Biographical and personal reply to the controversial book written by Radha Rajagopal-Sloss: Lives in The Shadow with J. Krishnamurti, which (on the author's words) allegedly contains: "misstatements of fact, false inferences and snide innuendoes, and it is heavily biased in an attempt to justify the author's parents  at Krishnamurti's expense".
 Lutyens, Mary (2005). J. Krishnamurti: A Life. This book is a compilation of The Years of Awakening, The Years of Fulfilment, and The Open Door.
Zimbalist, Mary; Forbes, Scott H. (2013). In the Presence of Krishnamurti: The Memoirs of Mary Zimbalist. The edited transcription of 94 audio recorded discussions that occurred over 14 years in which Mary Zimbalist reads out and discusses with Scott H. Forbes her daily dairies of 22 years of being with Krishnamurti.
Zimbalist, Mary (2018). In the Presence of Krishnamurti: Mary's Unfinished Book. Krishnamurti only asked two people to write about him: Mary Lutyens and Mary Zimbalist. He wanted Mary Lutyens to record the whole of his life, and he wanted Mary Zimbalist to write about what it was like to be with him, which she does using, as her source material, the daily dairies she kept for the 22 years she was with him. This work can also be found online after her initial but unfinished attempt to write a book, about what it was like to be with Krishnamurti. From this work, we know more about the daily life of Krishnamurti than any other famous person alive.

Other biographies 
A number of biographical works have been published. Many are by people who knew Krishnamurti at some point in his life, or had been associates of his for various lengths of time. Others are posthumous scholarly or lay works produced with or without the cooperation of people close to him.

 Print
 Keshav Ramachandra Chhapkhane . "J. Krushnamurti, Sandesh Ani Parichay". Short Introduction to philosophy of J. Krushnamurthi in Marathi Language ( India – Maharashtra) by author of "Swadhyay Dyaneshwari"  ( Author was a Philosopher, Theosophist, Pleader, Freedom fighter from Sangli-Maharashtra state, India born in 1875)
 Balfour-Clarke, Russel (1977). The Boyhood Of J. Krishnamurti. Reminiscences from one of the young Theosophists trusted with the boy Krishnamurti's upbringing.
 Blackburn, Gabriele (1996). The Light Of Krishnamurti. The author had known Krishnamurti since her childhood, and was one of the first students of the Happy Valley Schoolsince renamed Besant Hill Schoolthat was founded by Krishnamurti and associates in Ojai, California. Right education was one of Krishnamurti's major concerns. He established several schools, in India, the United States, and the United Kingdom.
 Blau, Evelyne (1995). Krishnamurti: 100 Years. Collecting reminiscences by people who knew him, and accounts of others (well known and not so well known) influenced by him, this book commemorates the 100th anniversary of Krishnamurti's birth, along with a look at his work and legacy. Evelyne Blau had been a Krishnamurti Foundation trustee since the 1970s.
 Chandmal, Asit (1985). One Thousand Moons: Krishnamurti at Eighty-Five. The author was a close friend and longtime associate of Krishnamurti in India.
 Chandmal, Asit (1995). One Thousand Suns: Krishnamurti at Eighty-Five and the Last Walk. This is an expanded follow up version of One Thousand Moons.
 Field, Sidney (1989). Krishnamurti: The Reluctant Messiah. Peter Hay, editor. The author originally met Krishnamurti in California in the 1920s and they remained friends until Krishnamurti's death.
 Giddu, Narayan (1998). As The River Joins The Ocean. Chandramouli Narsipur, editor. The author, an educator and principal of a Krishnamurti Foundation India-affiliated school, was Krishnamurti's nephew and a longtime associate.
 Grohe, Friedrich (1991). The Beauty of the Mountain. The author originally met Krishnamurti in 1983, and eventually became a trustee of several Krishnamurti Foundations.
 Holroyd, Stuart (1991). Krishnamurti: the man, the mystery, and the message.
 Krohnen, Michael (1996). The Kitchen Chronicles: 1001 Lunches with Krishnamurti. Reminiscences by the chef at Krishnamurti's Ojai, California home.
 Lutyens, Emily (1957). Candles in the Sun. Memoir by Mary Lutyens' mother Emily (née Lady Lytton, 1874–1964), who had a long and very intimate relationship with Krishnamurti.
 Lutyens, Mary (1990). The Life and Death of Krishnamurti An abridgement of her trilogy of Krishnamurti's life listed in Principal biographies above.
 Lutyens, Mary (1991). Krishnamurti: His Life and Death. Republication of The Life and Death of Krishnamurti with a different title and publisher.
 Lutyens, Mary (1995). The Boy Krishna. Pamphlet, subtitled "The First Fourteen Years in the Life of J. Krishnamurti".
 Lutyens, Mary (1996). Krishnamurti and the Rajagopals. The author's "personal reply" to Radha Rajagopal Sloss's book Lives in the Shadow with J. Krishnamurti (listed below), it contains detailed refutations of statements and allegations contained in that book.
 Patwardhan, Sunanda (1999). A Vision of the Sacred. The author had been a longtime friend of Krishnamurti and had worked as his private secretary in India.
 Ross, Joseph E. (2000). Krishnamurti: The Taormina seclusion 1912. Focuses on the young Krishnamurti's correspondence with various parties during a retreat to Taormina, Italy, in 1912.
 Sloss, Radha Rajagopal (1991). Lives in the Shadow with J. Krishnamurti. A critical look at the private life of Krishnamurti by the daughter of erstwhile close associates Rajagopal Desikacharya (D. Rajagopal) and Rosalind Rajagopal.
 Smith, Ingram (1989). Truth Is A Pathless Land: A Journey with Krishnamurti. The author had been a longtime associate of Krishnamurti in Australia.
 Smith, Ingram (1999). The Transparent Mind: A Journey with Krishnamurti. This is an expanded follow up version of A Journey with Krishnamurti, above.
 Vernon, Roland (2001). Star In The East: The Invention of a Messiah.
 Weeraperuma, Susunaga (1989). Krishnamurti as I Knew Him.
 Weeraperuma, Susunaga (2016). Remembering Krishnamurti: Personal Anecdotes About the World Teacher.
 Williams, Christine V. (2004). Jiddu Krishnamurti: World Philosopher. Based on a doctoral thesis submitted to the University of Technology, Sydney. Williams stated in a related conference paper, "The thesis for my biography was that the life of J. Krishnamurti could be read in the context of a stream of philosophy, Advaita Vedanta, based on the ancient sacred texts, the Vedas".
 Patnaik, Shuvendu (2015). "The Story of Krishnamurti – A Critical Perspective of His Life and Teachings". This book contains Jiddu Krishnamurti's life story together with his teachings, spiritual science and Theosophy, all in a single book. The book explores the science in spirituality through Krishnamurti's life and teachings, and presents it all in a story-style narrative.
 Forbes, Scott H. (2018) Krishnamurti: Preparing to leave. During the last 9 months of Krishnamurti's life the author spent 6 to 8 hours a day with Krishnamurti, up until the moment of his death, and kept detailed notes.  
Kishore, Mahesh (2019) Nitya – A Tale of Two Brothers

Video

 Krishnamurti Foundation of America (1995). The Future of Krishnamurti's Teachings. Short video produced by the Krishnamurti Foundation of America on the 100th anniversary of his birth. An introduction to Krishnamurti and his message.
 Lucas, George et al. (2007). "Jiddu Krishnamurti: The Reluctant Messiah". Lucasfilm-produced historical documentary, included in the DVD adaptation of the TV series The Young Indiana Jones Chronicles, listed below. Part of the Special Features in "Volume I: The Early Years Disk 7: The Journey of Radiance" DVD.
 Mendizza, Michael (1990). Krishnamurti: With A Silent Mind. One of several informational, quasi-biographical documentary films about J. Krishnamurti directed by Mendizza and produced by the Krishnamurti Foundation of America.

Other representations 
Among the following works are interpretations, studies, or comparative analyses of his life and message. Krishnamurti did not accept any interpreters, contemporary or future; instead, he advocated the unmediated examination of his work.

 Print
 Agrawal, Murari M. (2002). "Krishnamurti I" and "Krishnamurti II". Two sections in Chapter 7 of the book Freedom of the soul: a post-modern understanding of Hinduism, by the same author. An attempt to portray Krishnamurti's philosophy as being within the boundaries of some contemporary interpretations of Hinduism.
 Boutte, Veronica (2002). The phenomenology of compassion in the teachings of Jiddu Krishnamurti. An examination through the lens of Phenomenological Psychology. Part of a series of books on "Asian thought and religion".
 De La Cruz, Francis James C. (2005). "A Philosophy for Holistic Education". Following the views of J. Krishnamurti, this scholarly journal article presents a philosophy of holistic education based on the idea of school as a "community of learners."
 Dhopeshwarkar, Atmaram D. (1967). J. Krishnamurti and awareness in action. One of several books on Krishnamurti and his message by this author, a retired professor of philosophy.
 Eck, Diana L. (1968). "J. Krishnamurti: The Pathless Way". Compilation of the Forum for Correspondence and Contact.
 Erricker, Clive (2001). "Jiddu Krishnamurti and the open secret". Included in the book Contemporary spiritualities: social and religious contexts, edited by Clive and Jane Erricker.
 Fauché, Fabienne (2001). J.-P. Sartre et J. Krishnamurti: Deux "Athéismes" pour Une Morale (In French). (J.-P. Sartre and J. Krishnamurti: Two "Atheisms" for One Morality). Published thesis for a doctorate in Philosophy submitted 1998 to the Paris-Sorbonne University. Comparative analysis of elements of the respective philosophies of Jean-Paul Sartre and Jiddu Krishnamurti.
 Heber, Lilly (1933). Krishnamurti and the world crisis. Part of a series of books on Krishnamurti by the same author.
 Holroyd, Stuart (1980). The Quest of the Quiet Mind: The Philosophy of Krishnamurti.
 Horan, Richard (2011). "Krishnamurti". Chapter in Horan's Seeds, a book describing the author's "cross-country search for the grand old trees that once provided shade and shelter for America's greatest authors." Horan was interested in a pepper tree that featured in Krishnamurti's reputed "life-altering experiences" at Ojai in 1922.
 Kelman, Harold (1956). "Life history as therapy: Part II". Subtitled "On being aware". Second part of an article in The American Journal of Psychoanalysis authored by its editor. It includes discussion of Krishnamurti's ideas on awareness and quotes extensively from his then recently published work The First and Last Freedom.
 Kleindienst, William C. (c. 1926). The Great Lie: Krishnamurti, the false Hindu messiah of theosophy. One of two polemics against Krishnamurti that were authored by a conservative Christian clergyman during the World Teacher period.
 Kumar, Samrat Schmiem (2011). "The Inward Revolution: Aurobindo Ghose and Jiddu Krishnamurti". Chapter in The International Handbook of Peace Studies whose editors, (Wolfgang Dietrich and others) are affiliated with the Editorial Team of the UNESCO Chair for Peace Studies, University of Innsbruck. Kumar, a PhD Research fellow at the Department of Culture Studies and Oriental Languages, University of Oslo, juxtaposes Krishnamurti's and Aurobindo Ghose's (Sri Aurobindo) approaches to peace as part of the Handbook's focus on "the etymological meaning, the religious, legal and political use of the word peace."
 Martin, Raymond (2003). On Krishnamurti. College-level textbook for philosophy students, by the Department Chair of Philosophy at Union College, New York.
 Maxwell, Patrick (1994). "The Enigma of Krishnamurti". Peer reviewed article from the Journal for the Study of Religion. It "attempts to explore the elusive character of Krishnamurti's approach" and includes discussion of seemingly conflicting or contradictory aspects of Krishnamurti and his message. The author perceives similarities between Krishnamurti's approach and "the basic spirit" of Zen Buddhism.
 Methorst, Henri (2003). Krishnamurti: a spiritual revolutionary.
 Needleman, Jacob (1970). "A Note on Krishnamurti". Included in Needleman's book The New Religions.
 Ogletree, Aaron P. (2007). "Peace Profile: Jiddu Krishnamurti". Profile of Krishnamurti in the Peace Review.
 Réhault, Ludowic (1939). Krishnamurti: Man Is His Own Liberator. The author was acquainted with Krishnamurti and offers a background of the events leading up to his break with Theosophy, and of its aftermath. He also attempts an analysis and explanation of his message.
 Rodrigues, Hillary (1990). Insight and religious mind. In "American University StudiesSeries VII: Theology and Religion".
 Samuels, Henry C. (1929). Krishnamurti the Jew. Subtitled, "A presentation from the Jewish point of view". Pamphlet compiled by Samuels has short pieces and poems (including reprints of Krishnamurti's own work), and an "editorial review" of Krishnamurti's The Pool of Wisdom, originally published 1927.
 Sanat, Aryel (1999). The inner life of Krishnamurti. A book-length Theosophical examination of Krishnamurti. It attempts to reconcile elements of Esoteric Theosophical doctrine with certain aspects of his life that have not  been explained in a conclusive manner: the process (an unusual, lifelong condition), and his reputed inner mystical experiences.
 Schuller, Govert W. (1997). "Krishnamurti and the World Teacher Project". An analysis from a late-20th-century theosophical perspective. Originally published in the independent Theosophical History journal as one of its "Occasional Papers".
 Suares, Carlo (1953). Krishnamurti and the Unity of Man. Suares originally met Krishnamurti in the 1940s; they maintained a four-decade long friendship.
 Thapan, Meenakshi (2006). Life at school: an ethnographic study. Examines the "ideology and working" of the Rishi Valley School, a coeducational residential school founded by Krishnamurti and run by the Krishnamurti Foundation India.
 Thuruthiyil, Scaria (1999). The joy of creative living.
 Vas, Luis S. R. (1971). The Mind of J. Krishnamurti. Compilation of personal essays, comparative studies, analyses, etc. by various authors, as well as a small number of discussions between Krishnamurti and others. Edited by Luis Vas. Includes contributions by authors Henry Miller and Aldous Huxley. Also includes a discussion between Krishnamurti and composer Leopold Stokowski.
 Weeraperuma, Susunaga (1978). Living and Dying from Moment to Moment. An investigation of J. Krishnamurti's Teachings.
 Weeraperuma, Susunaga (1983). That Pathless Land: Essays on the Beauty and Uniqueness of J. Krishnamurti's Teachings.
 Weeraperuma, Susunaga (1984). Bliss of Reality: Essays on J. Krishnamurti's Extraordinary Insights into Life.
 Weeraperuma, Susunaga (1986). Sayings of J. Krishnamurti. A collection of Krishnamurti's significant sayings on 118 different subjects.
 Williams, Christine V. (2004). "J. Krishnamurti: Crossing cultural borders or ignoring their existence?" Paper presented to the 15th Biennial Conference of the Asian Studies Association of Australia. The methodology she followed in writing a biography of Krishnamurti as an attempt to present his life and work in the context of Advaita Vedanta.
 Wit, Adriaan de (1992). "Krishnamurti and Ionesco: Pioneers of the New Age Perception/Consciousness". Article in the peer-reviewed Journal of Evolutionary Psychology. Includes commentary on the ideas of Krishnamurti and absurdist playwright Eugène Ionesco regarding language, its use and meaning. Ionesco referenced Krishnamurti in his first play, The Bald Soprano, which premiered 1950.

Bibliographies, indices, and other helpers
 Print
 Krishnamurti Foundations (1997). Unconditionally Free. Informational booklet with Krishnamurti quotes and a chronology that includes a listing of places he spoke at from 1911 to 1986.
 Van der Struijf, Cathy & Van der Struijf, John. The Concise Guide to Krishnamurti: A Study Companion and Index to the Recorded Teachings (1979–1986). Compiled by Cathy and John Van der Struijf, edited by Stephen Smith.
 Weeraperuma, Susunaga (1974). A bibliography of the life and teachings of Jiddu Krishnamurti.
 Weeraperuma, Susunaga (1996). Jiddu Krishnamurti: a bibliographical guide. Revised edition of work originally published as Supplement to A bibliography of the life and teachings of Jiddu Krishnamurti.
 Patnaik, Shuvendu (2015). "The Story of Krishnamurti – A Critical Perspective of His Life and Teachings". This book contains Jiddu Krishnamurti's life story together with his teachings, spiritual science and Theosophy, all in a single book. The book explores the science in spirituality through Krishnamurti's life and teachings, and presents it all in a story-style narrative. http://krishnamurtibook.com/

Reference resources
 Print
 Byers, Paula K. (Senior editor) (1998). "Jiddu Krishnamurti". Entry in the 17-volume Encyclopedia of World Biography, includes section on "Krishnamurti's Philosophy".
 Knowles, Elizabeth (Editor) (2004). "Jiddu Krishnamurti (d. 1986)". Krishnamurti entry at the Oxford Dictionary of Quotations, 2004 edition. The dictionary carries three quotes attributed to Krishnamurti including a "Truth is a pathless land ..." quotation.
 McGhee, Richard D. (2000). "Jiddu Krishnamurti". Profile of Krishnamurti's philosophy in World Philosophers and Their Works, includes short biographical note, analysis of his message as it appeared in published works, and a comprehensive, multipage review of Krishnamurti's Think on These Things.
 White, Charles J. (2005). "Krishnamurti, Jiddu". Multipage entry in the 15-volume Encyclopedia of Religions, includes a bibliography.

Mass media items 
Krishnamurti had been in the public spotlight more or less consistently since his adolescence; items about him appeared in mass media and periodical publications throughout his life with varying frequency depending on his perceived topicality.

The following selections are listed (per media category) by date of issue or release in ascending order, then by author, editor or other creator. If the author etc. is unknown, items are sublisted by publication name or program title.

 Broadcast
 Levin, Bernard 'et al. (20 June 1981). "Jiddu Krishnamurti". British journalist Bernard Levin interviewed Krishnamurti in May 1981 at the Brockwood Park School which was founded in 1969 by Krishnamurti. The resulting 30-minute television program aired on BBC Two (during prime time) in June of the same year; it received mixed critical reviews.

 Online
 The Hindu Online (26 January 2008). "Foundation working to popularise J Krishnamurti’s message". News article from the online edition of The Hindu newspaper about contemporary activities and projects of the Krishnamurti Foundation India.

 Print
 The New York Times (4 August 1929). "Krishnamurti Ends Order Of The Star; Theosophists' Society Dissolved Because Leader Believes Followers Ignore 'Truth'." Report from the 1929 Star Camp at Ommen, the Netherlands, about Krishnamurti's dissolution of the Order of the Star, an organization established to assist him in his then-expected role as the so-called World Teacher.
 The Los Angeles Times (22 April 1934). "Krishnamurti Has New Goal". Brief report about Krishnamurti's plans after the dissolution of the Order of the Star.
 Wood, Ernest (December 1964). "No Religion Higher Than Truth". Article in The American Theosophist magazine by one of Charles Webster Leadbeater's close associates includes an eyewitness account of Krishnamurti's "discovery" by Leadbeater, and comments on related events and controversies.
 Ingram, Catherine & Jacobs, Leonard (July 1983). "I Don't Believe in Anything". Long and far-ranging interview of Krishnamurti in the East West Journal, with foreword by Leonard Jacobs, publisher.
 Stephan, Karin (July 1983). "The Man Who Would Not Play God". Biographical sketch of Krishnamurti from the East West Journal, ancillary to his interview appearing in the same issue.
 Weatherby, William J. (19 February 1986). "Wise traveller in a pathless land". Obituary, in the London newspaper The Guardian.
 Gillman, Ken (August–October 1998). "Jiddu Krishnamurti". Extensive article from the editor of the astrological quarterly Considerations. Reproduces Krishnamurti's natal chart originally cast shortly after his birth by a well-known Vedic astrologer, and adds commentary and biographical notes.
 Gardner, Martin (July–August 2000). "David Bohm and  Krishnamurti". Critical article in the Skeptical Inquirer magazine questions Bohm's and Krishnamurti's philosophical views, as well as the significance of their dialogue. Krishnamurti critique draws heavily on the book Lives in the Shadow with J. Krishnamurti, listed in Other biographies above.
 Eyres, Harry (21 May 2005). "Rare retreat without restrictions". Article in the Financial Times newspaper about the Krishnamurti Centre at Brockwood Park, England, includes a short summary of Krishnamurti's life and message. The author calls his encounters with Krishnamurti's message an "unfailingly bracing and chastening experience".

 Artistic depictions 
 Film, television, and theater
 Lucas, George et al. (1993). "The Young Indiana Jones Chronicles: Benares, January 1910". Episode in Emmy Award winning American television series created by George Lucas. The series explores the childhood and youth of the fictional character Indiana Jones, and in this episode, "old Indy attempts to enlighten a down on his luck trucker by telling him about the most extraordinary person he ever met: Krishnamurti." Role of young Krishnamurti played by the Indian actor Hemanth Rao. [Fact-based fictional representation].

 Literature and poetry
 Beyer, Lynne (1993). "Krishnamurti's Journal". Short poem apparently inspired by one of Krishnamurti's published diaries.
 Jeffers, Robinson (1927). "Credo". Jeffers had reputedly written this poem about Krishnamurti, whom he met and befriended in the mid-1930s.

Indian Classical Dance
Inspired by Jiddu Krishnamurti's teachings, Dega Deva Kumar Reddy, an alumnus of Rishi Valley School conceptualized and produced 'Essence of Life' dance form with five classical Indian dance schools - Bharatanatyam, Kuchipudi, Odissi, Kathak and Mohiniyattam across India. Essence of Life received rare accolades.

 Music and song
Krishnamurti's message has found resonance in the life and work of composers, performers and songwriters in a variety of music genres. He has been cited as an influence in the artistic and personal development of pioneering jazz musician John Coltrane and has been similarly acknowledged by singer-songwriter Van Morrison, and Garry Cobain of the experimental electronic music act The Future Sound of London, among others.
 Kno (2010). "The New Day (Death Has No Meaning)". Recording by hip-hop producer and artist Kno. Lyrics mainly consist of excerpts of Krishnamurti from a discussion with David Bohm in 1980. Included in Kno's collection Death is Silent. The collection also contains the track "Loneliness", which briefly samples Krishnamurti from the same discussion.
 Kokolo (2004). More Consideration. The Afrobeat band Kokolo has stated that Krishnamurti's message was a major influence in the making of this recording.
 Kollektiv Turmstrasse (2010). "Addio Addio". Production by German electronic dance music duo Kollektiv Turmstrasse, incorporates audio excerpts from a Krishnamurti talk. Included in their 2010 recording Rebellion Der Träumer (in German). (Rebellion of the Dreamer).
 Lindberg, Christian (2008). "Visions and Non Thoughts, for chorus & trombone". This piece, by classical and contemporary music trombonist Christian Lindberg was commissioned by the Swedish Radio Choir and Concerts Sweden, and incorporates text by Krishnamurti, among others. Included in the 2010 recording Visions and Non Thoughts by the Swedish Radio Choir, conducted by Ragnar Bohlin.
 Live (1991). Mental Jewelry. This recording by the rock band Live has many lyrical references to Krishnamurti's teachings.

 Visual arts
The French expressionist sculptor Antoine Bourdelle produced drawings and two bronze busts of him in the 1920s, while photographers Cecil Beaton and Edward Weston each shot several portraits and studies, a number of which illustrated Krishnamurti books.
  Beaton, Cecil (1959). "J. Krishnamurti". Portrait, detail appears on the cover of the Second Penguin Krishnamurti Reader, originally published 1972.
 Bourdelle, Emile-Antoine (1927). "Krishnamurti". Sculpture works: a terracota "Study", "Little Head with Base" (plaster), "Head with Base" (two bronzes). Listing included in a 1965 Bourdelle-retrospective publication; descriptions include contemporary [c. 1965] ownership, exhibition and reproduction information.
 Weston, Edward (1935). "Jiddu Krishnamurti". Portrait, detail appears on the front cover of several imprints of The First and Last Freedom, paperback edition.

 Miscellaneous other
 Conferences and symposia
 Thapan, Meenakshi (4–6 February 2010). Being Alive to Responsible Citizenship: J. Krishnamurti and the Challenge for Education. Non-academic conference organized by Thapan, Professor with the Department of Sociology at the University of Delhi. One of Thapan's specialties is the Sociology of education. Conference sponsored by the University of Delhi.

 Philately
 India Post (11 May 1987). J. Krishnamurti''. English-language commemorative stamp, issued by the Indian Postal Service on the occasion of Krishnamurti's birthday. [Note birthdate used for the issue is according to a westernized rendition of the Hindu calendar].  Photogravure in sepia and crimson based on an original photograph by Edward Weston. Pupul Jayakar, Krishnamurti's longtime close friend, associate and authorized biographer, provided admiring biographical notes as part of the first day of issue information package.

 Webpage design
 Tanny, Phil (undated). "The Krishnamurti Widget". A portable video player application, this free Web widget "presents video of Krishnamurti in person, explaining his teachings in his own words." , it aggregated over 200 videos originally posted on YouTube.

See also
Jiddu Krishnamurti bibliography

Notes and sources

Sources for notes

Notes

References

External links

Listed alphabetically.
 Melbourne, Australia-based independent website devoted to "an exploration into the totality of  workthe books, dialogues, articles, and the public talks covering in all around 38 years, from 1948–1986". 
 Independent website focusing on the relevance of Krishnamurti's message regarding the continuing world crises. Exploring this aspect of Krishnamurti's message as an integral part of his overall philosophy, it is aimed primarily at people already familiar with Krishnamurti's teaching. 
 Independent Dutch language website focuses on the activities of Krishnamurti in Ommen, the Netherlands, during the 1920s and 1930s. 
 Independent website whose "aim is to provide a comprehensive Krishnamurti resource on the internet." 
 Social networking website affiliated with the official Krishnamurti Foundations. Administered by the Krishnamurti Foundation of America. Hosted on the Ning social networking platform. 
 An unaffiliated organization that explores the work of Jiddu Krishnamurti and related others. 

Jiddu Krishnamurti
Indian biographies
List of works about